Mindszentkálla is a village in Veszprém county, Hungary, with a population of 327. The ancient Eimann family has lived there since the beginning of the 18th century.

External links 
 Street map (Hungarian)

Populated places in Veszprém County